The Pocomoke people were a historic Native American tribe whose territory encompassed the rivers Pocomoke, Great Annemessex, Little Annemessex, and Manokin, the bays of Monie and Chincoteague, and the sounds of Pocomoke and Tangier.

History 
Their numbers decreased during the 17th and 18th centuries due to the effects of diseases brought from Europe, massacres by Virginia colonists, and forced displacement from their territory by numerous land grants and patents to immigrants and transports. Beginning about 1742 some Pocomoke families moved northward, by way of the Susquehanna River and settled in present-day Pennsylvania and Canada, while others cohabited with the Assateague, Nanticoke, and Choptanks near Indian River.

Subtribes 
Several related groups were considered subtribes of the Pocomoke:
 Acquintica, also spelled Aquintankec, Aquinteca
 Annamessex, Annamessick
 Gingoteque, Chingotegue, Gingateege, Gingo Teague, Yingoteague
 Manokin, Mannanokin, Monoakin
 Morumsco
 Nasswatex, Nuswattax
 Quandanquan.

Heritage group 
The Pocomoke Indian Nation, which is not recognized as a tribe, claims to descend from the Pocomoke people. It incorporated as a Maryland as a 501(c)(3) nonprofit organization in 2014. No petition has been submitted to date for requesting formal recognition from the United States or the State of Maryland.

Notes

References

External links
 Pocomoke Indian History on the Eastern Shore
 Delmarva Settlers. The Indians of the Lower Eastern Shore, by Christine Richardson

Eastern Algonquian peoples
Extinct Native American tribes
Native American tribes in Maryland
Unrecognized tribes in the United States